Guillermo Kane (born 12 October 1981) is an activist in the Workers' Party (Argentina).

He studied at the University of Buenos Aires, and now teaches history there.

From July 2015 to December 2016 he was a deputy in the legislature of Buenos Aires Province, as part of the rotation of seats by the Workers' Left Front.

He was a candidate in the 2017 Argentine provincial elections.

He became a deputy in Buenos Aires province again in December 2021.

External links 
Kane article on taking his seat (Spanish)
video of him speaking (Spanish)
biography (Spanish)

1981 births
People from Buenos Aires Province
Workers' Party (Argentina) politicians
University of Buenos Aires alumni
Living people
21st-century Argentine historians
Argentine male writers
Male non-fiction writers
Academic staff of the University of Buenos Aires